is a Japanese footballer who currently plays for Chattanooga FC.

Career
Genki Miyachi joined Nagoya Grampus for 2017 season, but he switched mid-season to Matsumoto Yamaga. After his rookie season, he opted to go on loan to Azul Claro Numazu for 2018.

Club statistics
Updated to 22 February 2018.

References

External links

Profile at Nagoya Grampus
Profile at Matsumoto Yamaga FC
Profile at Azul Claro Numazu

1994 births
Living people
Keio University alumni
Association football people from Shizuoka Prefecture
Japanese footballers
J2 League players
J3 League players
Nagoya Grampus players
Matsumoto Yamaga FC players
Azul Claro Numazu players

Association football midfielders
Association football defenders
Chattanooga FC players